John Dyson may refer to:

Sport
 John Dyson (cricketer, born 1954), Australian international cricketer
 John Dyson (rugby) (1866–1909), English rugby union player
 John Dyson (cricketer, born 1913) (1913–1991), English cricketer
 John Barry Dyson (1942–1995), English association footballer for several Football League clubs including Tranmere Rovers and Watford
 Jack Dyson (1934–2000), English first-class cricketer

Other
 John Dyson, Lord Dyson (born 1943), judge in the English High Court and later the Supreme Court
 John S. Dyson, political and business leader in New York
 John Dyson, musician best known as a member of the former 1980s New Age instrumental duo Wavestar